Rajanna Dora Peedika is an Indian politician who is serving as Deputy Chief Minister of Andhra Pradesh from 2022 and Member of Andhra Pradesh Legislative Assembly from Salur Assembly constituency from 2009. He also served as Minister for Tribal Welfare.

References 

Deputy Chief Ministers of Andhra Pradesh
Members of the Andhra Pradesh Legislative Assembly
Year of birth missing (living people)
Living people